St. Paul Church is a Roman Catholic parish with an elementary school in the Diocese of Springfield in Illinois located in Highland, Illinois. The Kirchenfest, a church picnic held each year, is one of the largest church festivals in Southern Illinois.

Leadership

Rev. Pat Jakel, Pastor
Rev. Piotr Kosk, Parochial Vicar
Stefan Kaniewski, Seminarian (St. Meinrad) 
Deacon Dave Bohnenstiehl

Mass times
Saturday at 4:00 p.m. and Sunday at 7:00 am, 8:30 am and 10:00 a.m.

Kirchenfest

Kirchenfest, which is German for "Church Festival," is one of the largest church festivals in Southern Illinois. The event spreads over six acres on the grounds of St. Paul Parish. It originally began in 1970. The festival has a German theme, as the Highland, Illinois community is primarily Swiss and German heritage.

Events at the Kirchenfest:
 Strassenlauf 5K & 2K Run/Walk
 Saturday morning Auction, during which an 8-foot pizza is purchased

References

External links
St. Paul Parish and School - Highland, IL
St. Paul Kirchenfest

Catholic elementary schools in Illinois
Schools in Madison County, Illinois
Churches in the Roman Catholic Diocese of Springfield in Illinois